A Weiqi tournament was held at the 2010 Asian Games in Guangzhou for the first time at an Asiad. The three events in the competition - men's team, women's team and mixed doubles — were held between 20 and 26 November 2010 at the Guangzhou Chess Institute.

Competitors from China, Hong Kong, Japan, South Korea, North Korea, Malaysia, Mongolia, Chinese Taipei, Thailand and Vietnam were taking part in Weiqi across the three events, although not all nations had competitors in each.

Schedule

Medalists

Medal table

Participating nations
A total of 77 athletes from 10 nations competed in go at the 2010 Asian Games:

References

External links 
 Official site
 Official site, with details & photos of Chess, Weiqi (Go) and Xiangqi 

 
2010 Asian Games events
Asian Games
2010